Dasia olivacea, the olive dasia or olive tree skink, is a species of skink native to Southeast Asia.

Distribution
Dasia olivacea is found south of approximately 15° north in Southeast Asia, including parts of Myanmar, Thailand, Viet Nam, Laos, Malaysia and Singapore as well as throughout the island of Borneo, on Java and nearby Indonesian islands, and the Indian Andaman and Nicobar Islands. It is known from a single locality in Cambodia. The northernmost locality for D. olivacea is the Sakaerat Environmental Research Station in the Nakhon Ratchasima Province of eastern Thailand.

Ecology and conservation
Dasia olivacea lives almost exclusively in trees, only rarely descending to nest or to move between trees. Eggs may be laid more than once per year, in clutches of up to 14 eggs; incubation lasts 69 days. Because it is very widespread and ecologically flexible, D. olivacea is considered to be a species of Least Concern on the IUCN Red List.

Taxonomy
Dasia olivacea was first described by John Edward Gray in an 1839 publication in the Annals of Natural History, as the type species of the new genus Dasia. The type locality was "Prince of Wales Island" (now Penang Island).

Description
Mature individuals of Dasia olivacea have a green back, with bronze scales towards the flanks and 12 bands of ocelli (eye-like spots) reaching from side to side. The head is primarily a dark olive-green colour with black markings; the underside of the head is a bluish to yellowish green.

Further reading

References

olivacea
Reptiles of Myanmar
Reptiles of Borneo
Reptiles of Thailand
Reptiles described in 1839
Taxa named by John Edward Gray
Reptiles of the Malay Peninsula
Reptiles of Laos
Reptiles of Vietnam
Fauna of Java
Fauna of Sumatra